Rafael Roballo Maciel is a Brazilian footballer who currently plays as a goalkeeper for Juazeirense.

References

Brazilian footballers
Brazilian expatriate footballers
1990 births
Living people
Footballers from Curitiba
Association football goalkeepers
Rio Preto Esporte Clube players
Mirassol Futebol Clube players
ABC Futebol Clube players
América Futebol Clube (RN) players
Duque de Caxias Futebol Clube players
Atlético Clube Goianiense players
Grêmio Esportivo Glória players
Esporte Clube Novo Hamburgo players
Sport Club São Paulo players
Ypiranga Futebol Clube players
Associação Desportiva Confiança players
Esteghlal Khuzestan players
Esporte Clube Taubaté players
Luverdense Esporte Clube players
Clube Recreativo e Atlético Catalano players
Sociedade Desportiva Juazeirense players
Persian Gulf Pro League players
Campeonato Brasileiro Série B players
Campeonato Brasileiro Série C players
Campeonato Brasileiro Série D players
Brazilian expatriate sportspeople in Iran
Expatriate footballers in Iran